Postal codes in the Faroe Islands consist of the two letter ISO 3166 code "FO", followed by three digits:

P/F Postverk Føroya
Óðinshædd 22  
FO-100 Tórshavn  
FAROE ISLANDS

PO Box addresses
Separate postal codes are used for PO Box addresses in the capital Tórshavn and some other towns:

HN Jacobsens Bókahandil 
Postboks 55
FO-110 Tórshavn
FAROE ISLANDS

Former Danish postal codes
Previously, the Faroe Islands formed part of the Danish postcode system, introduced in 1967, which also included Greenland. This used the number range 3800 to 3899, and the "DK" prefix for Denmark:

Føroya Ferdamannafelag
DK-3800 Tórshavn
FAROE ISLANDS

Later on, the "FR" prefix was used:

DGU Føroyadeild 
Debesartrøð
FR 3800 Tórshavn
FAROE ISLANDS

When the three-digit postal codes were first introduced, they were used for PO Box addresses, alongside the existing four-digit ones.

References

Postal codes by country